Jasbir Singh ( – 27 December 2019) was an Indian politician from Punjab belonging to Indian National Congress. He was a legislator of the Punjab Legislative Assembly. He was a minister of the Punjab Government too.

Biography
Singh was elected as a member of the Punjab Legislative Assembly from Sangrur  in 1992. Then, he served as a minister of the Punjab Government in 1992.

Singh died of heart attack on 27 December 2019 at the age of 78.

References

2019 deaths
Indian National Congress politicians from Punjab, India
Members of the Punjab Legislative Assembly
1940s births
People from Sangrur district
State cabinet ministers of Punjab, India